Luna Sobrón Galmés (born 22 May 1994) is a professional golfer from Spain. She won the 2014 European Ladies Amateur Championship and plays on the Ladies European Tour and the LPGA Tour.

Amateur career
Sobrón had a successful amateur career, representing Spain at an international level. She won the 2013 Spanish International Stroke Play, was runner-up at the 2013 The Womens Amateur Championship and won the 2014 European Ladies Amateur Championship. She finished tied for 13th at the 2015 Women's British Open to take home the Smyth Salver award for low amateur.

She was part of the Spanish team that was runner-up at the 2012 European Girls' Team Championship in Germany and won the 2013 European Ladies' Team Championship in England.

Professional career
Sobrón turned professional in 2016 and joined the LET. She posted five top-25 finishes on the 2017 Ladies European Tour. She finished T3 in the 2018 Lacoste Ladies Open de France and T3 in the 2019 Fatima Bint Mubarak Ladies Open. She finished 39th on the 2019 Order of Merit.
 
Sobrón finished T5 at the 2017 LPGA Final Qualifying Tournament to earn a LPGA card for the 2018 season, where she played in 21 events and made eight cuts, including at the 2018 U.S. Women's Open. 

In 2020, she finished joint runner-up at the Saudi Ladies Team International with Stephanie Kyriacou and Anne Van Dam, two strokes behind Emily Kristine Pedersen.

In 2021, she made six cuts in 17 starts on the LPGA Tour, to finished 124th in the ranking.

Amateur wins 
2013 Spanish International Stroke Play
2014 European Ladies Amateur Championship

Professional wins (3)

LET Access Series (3)

Results in LPGA majors
Results not in chronological order

CUT = missed the half-way cut
NT = no tournament
T = tied

Team appearances
Amateur
Junior Solheim Cup (representing Europe): 2011
European Girls' Team Championship (representing Spain): 2011, 2012
European Ladies' Team Championship (representing Spain): 2013 (winners), 2014, 2015, 2016
Espirito Santo Trophy (representing Spain): 2014, 2016
Vagliano Trophy (representing the Continent of Europe): 2015 (winners)
Patsy Hankins Trophy (representing Europe): 2016

References

External links

Spanish female golfers
Ladies European Tour golfers
LPGA Tour golfers
Sportspeople from Palma de Mallorca
1994 births
Living people
20th-century Spanish women
21st-century Spanish women